Lubomír Petruš (born 17 July 1990) is a Czech cyclo-cross and road cyclist, who currently rides for UCI Continental team . He represented his nation in the men's elite event at the 2016 UCI Cyclo-cross World Championships  in Heusden-Zolder.

Major results

Cyclo-cross
2006–2007
 2nd National Junior Championships
2007–2008
 1st  European Junior Championships
 1st  National Junior Championships
 3rd  UCI Junior World Championships
2008–2009
 2nd National Under-23 Championships
2009–2010
 1st Namur, Under-23 GvA Trophy
2015–2016
 1st XXII Przełajowy Wyscig Kolarski "BRYKSY CROSS"

Road
2007
 3rd Road race, National Junior Road Championships
2009
 2nd Overall Tour Alsace
2010
 2nd Road race, National Under-23 Road Championships
2012
 1st Stage 2 Tour de Liège
 10th Overall Thüringen Rundfahrt U23

References

External links

1990 births
Living people
Cyclo-cross cyclists
Czech male cyclists
People from Vrbno pod Pradědem
Sportspeople from the Moravian-Silesian Region